The Sweet Grass Hills ("three peaks") are a small group of low mountains rising more than  above the surrounding plains southwest of Whitlash, Montana, in Liberty and Toole County, Montana. Quite prominent in the local area, they are clearly visible from US Highway 2 to the south, I-15, and can sometimes be seen as far North as the Crowsnest Highway (Highway 3) near Medicine Hat in Alberta as well as from the West, near Glacier National Park and Browning, Montana. Other named peaks in the small group are Gold Butte, East Butte (with two peaks, the taller of which at ), and Mount Lebanon. 
The Sweet Grass Hills are an example of the island ranges that dot the central third portion of the state of Montana. These island ranges, completely surrounded by the 'sea' of plains and not geographically (or often geologically) part of the Rocky Mountains to the west, are "biological hotspots", containing more species than the prairie below.

Formation and natural features

The hills were formed in the early Paleogene period, and geologically are known as stocks - intrusive igneous rock forced up from below and solidified. Because of uplift and erosion, the overlying rock formations have disappeared. The upper slopes of the hills have not been glaciated and would have stood above the ice sheet that covered the area during the last ice age. Since the Sweet Grass Hills are at a higher elevation than the surrounding prairie, temperatures are cooler and precipitation is higher. Forested areas, consisting mainly of Douglas fir, are therefore able to grow on the hills' slopes.

Cultural significance
The Sweet Grass Hills are a sacred site of the Blackfoot aboriginal people who live on both sides of the 49th parallel north which forms the Canada–United States border.  The Hills were the site of a battle between Native people and wolfers in 1872.  The Sweet Grass Hills Treaty of 1887 was signed between the Blackfeet and the United States, ceding  of land to the US Government, and dividing the remaining  into three separate reservations – The Blackfeet, Fort Belknap and Fort Peck. This is often referred to as the Sweet Grass Hills Treaty/Agreement and was ratified by congress in 1888.   In 1993, the Hills were listed as one of America's Most Endangered Places.  Mineral claims were staked here by Manhattan Minerals in 1995.

See also 
 Sweet Grass, Montana
 Milk River (Alberta–Montana)
 Milk River Ridge
 List of mountain ranges in Montana

Notes

Mountain ranges of Montana
Landforms of Toole County, Montana
Blackfoot culture
Religious places of the indigenous peoples of North America
Sacred mountains